Solid Harmonie (stylised as Solid HarmoniE, also known as SHE) are a British-American pop girl group. The group was moderately successful, releasing five singles and a self-titled album, before disbanding in 2000. They had the most success in the Netherlands where their album went to No. 1 in the albums chart and was certified gold. Also the single "I Want You to Want Me" peaked at #4 in the Dutch singles chart. They sold over a million records worldwide.

History

1996–1997: Formation
Solid Harmonie formed in 1996 by Lou Pearlman as a female opposite of his earlier created boy bands such as N Sync and Backstreet Boys. They were signed to Jive Records in the United States. Initially, the band was made up of the trio Rebecca Onslow, Melissa Graham, who was playing in a popular Irish band called Calvary in 1996, and Mariama Goodman . They released their debut single "Got 2 Have Ya" in 1996, before Goodman left in 1997 to care for her ill mother.

1997–1998: Goodman's first departure and Solid HarmoniE

Goodman was immediately replaced by American Elisa Cariera in 1997. However, Goodman rejoined the band later in the year and the group became a four-piece. The group was successful, releasing the four singles "I'll Be There for You", "I Want You to Want Me", "I Wanna Love You" and "To Love Once Again" preceded by their self-titled debut album release "Solid Harmonie". The album includes all their hits except "Got 2 Have Ya", which was only released as a CD single in Europe, and the Christmas song "Give Love on Christmas Day" (originally recorded by The Jackson 5),
which can be found exclusively on a Christmas compilation from the German magazine Bravo entitled Bravo Christmas Vol. 3 (1996/9).

1998–2000: Goodman's second departure, Graham's departure and disbandment
Mariama Goodman left once again and then joined R&B girl group Honeyz.  Graham also left and pursued a solo career. After the departures of Goodman and Graham, Onslow and Cariera decided to stay with Solid Harmonie and went back to Orlando, Florida in 1999 where they had several successful tours. Soon Puerto Rican Jenilca Franchesca Giusti joined the band in 1999 after an audition held in Cariera's hometown Orlando, Florida and started briefly recording for the second studio album. The new Solid Harmonie trio was on the cover of TeenFaces magazine on its October issue. Their second album was never released as they could not come to an agreement with their record label, or find a new one once they were without a label. After legal issues, the group lost their recording contract and disbanded. The band eventually disbanded in the early 2000 to embark on solo careers. In december 2021 it was announced that the second album will be released on the 15th of February through CMG/S3 Recordings under exclusive license to ToCo Music, EQ Entertainment en Bryndak Records. The release will include two new remixes of If Your Daddy Knew and So Good. S3 Recordings will have a limited edition cd available. This release is Solid HarmoniE TWO

2014–present: "Circus" and Two
In 2014, Solid HarmoniE announced released a single, "Circus", with the lineup of Melissa Graham, Beki Onslow and Elisa Cariera. However, they did not release any further singles and no album materialised. 

In 2022, a newly mastered version of Solid HarmoniE's shelved second album (recorded by Beki, Elisa and Jenilca) was released under the title Two. This included the tracks "Make Me" (later recorded by Jennifer Paige), "World Without You" (originally recorded by Wild Orchid) and "Intuition" (later recorded by Liz).

Two was released February 2022 - singles "Sliver Lining" and "So Good". The album has 2 extra tracks printed "If Your Daddy Knew" Skeady Remix and "Sliver Lining" Skeady Remix.

Musical style
Solid Harmonie's debut album was heavily influenced by similar teen pop acts from that period, which was made famous and popular by similar artists such as the more successful Spice Girls, credited for being the pioneers that paved the way for the commercial breakthrough of teen pop in the late 1990s, Backstreet Boys or NSYNC. Teen pop songwriter pioneer Max Martin wrote all of the singles on that album. The shelved follow-up album, Two, had more of an R&B influence but was still very pop-leaning.

Members

Discography

Albums

Singles

Music videos

References

External links
Fortunecity.com
 Solidharmonie2013Official

British pop girl groups
British pop music groups
Lou Pearlman
Musical groups established in 1996
Musical groups disestablished in 2000
Musical groups reestablished in 2013
All-female bands